Black Swans is a 2005 Dutch drama film. The film won a Golden Calf for Best Sound at the Netherlands Film Festival in 2005. It also showed at the 2005 International Film Festival Rotterdam.

Plot

Marleen works as a volunteer in a rest home in Spain. When she meets Vince they are attracted to each other. Their passionate relationship has its ups and downs, and eventually Marleen ends up in a hospital. The film ends when Marleen walks into the sea.

Cast
 Carice van Houten as Marleen
 Dragan Bakema as Vince
 Mohammed Chaara as Mo, friend of Vince

Production

The film is set and filmed at the Costa de Almería in Spain in 2003. Due to financial problems the film was not released until 2005.

References

External links
 Official website
 
 

2005 films
2005 drama films
Dutch drama films
2000s Dutch-language films